The Americas Zone was one of the three zones of the regional Davis Cup competition in 1997.

In the Americas Zone there were four different tiers, called groups, in which teams competed against each other to advance to the upper tier. The top two teams in Group IV advanced to the Americas Zone Group III in 1998. All other teams remained in Group IV.

Participating nations

Draw
 Venue: Southampton Princess Hotel, Southampton, Bermuda
 Date: 1–3 May

  and  promoted to Group III in 1998.

Results

Bermuda vs. Costa Rica

Costa Rica vs. Eastern Caribbean

Bermuda vs. Eastern Caribbean

References

External links
Davis Cup official website

Davis Cup Americas Zone
Americas Zone Group IV